Thiselton may refer to:
Anthony Thiselton (born 1937), English Anglican priest
Thiselton-Dyer, a double-barrelled name
Thiseltonia, a genus of Australian plants